Troy Majors Fleming (born October 1, 1980 in Franklin, Tennessee) is a former American football fullback. He was originally drafted by the Tennessee Titans in the sixth round of the 2004 NFL Draft. He played college football at Tennessee.

Early years
Fleming attended Battle Ground Academy in Franklin, Tennessee and was a letterman in football, basketball, and track. In football, he led his teams to three Division II Class A Championships, was a three-time first-team All-State selection and a three-time All-Region selection, and was twice named Division II Class A Mister Football. He finished his career as the number two all time yards gainer in national high school football history, currently third all-time.
He was a former coach at Concord Christian School in Knoxville, TN. He is now employed by Knox County Parks and Recs in Knoxville, TN. Troy is now the Defensive Line coach at Knoxville Catholic.

College career
Fleming attended the University of Tennessee at Knoxville from 1999-2004.  During his time there, he played Running Back for the Volunteers.  As a freshman he saw limited time on the field. He averaged 3.9 yards on 9 carries and totaled 35 yards for the entire season.  He caught the ball 6 times for 71 yards and averaged 11.8 YAC.  He had no touchdowns receiving or rushing.  His sophomore year he averaged 4.2 yards on 24 carries and rushed for 102 yards.  He caught the ball 10 times for 39 and averaged 3.9 YAC.  That year, he had 0 touchdowns rushing, but 3 receiving TDs.  His junior year he carried the ball 34 times and rushed for 162 total yards averaging 4.8 and totaled one rushing touchdown.  He caught the ball 21 times for 120 yards and averaged 5.7 YAC.  His senior year he rushed 17 for 43 averaging 2.5 yards.  He caught the ball 36 times for 36 times for 262 and averaged 7.3 YAC and totaled 2 touchdowns.

NFL career
Fleming was drafted by the Tennessee Titans in the 6th round of the 2004 NFL Draft.  He played two seasons for the Titans before being released in 2006.  With the Titans, he started played 29 games and started 2 at Fullback.  He rushed 7 times for 40 yards and averaged 5.7 yards a carry in 2004.  He caught 19 passes and totaled 164 yards averaging 8.6 YAC for 2 touchdowns.  In 2005, Fleming caught 10 passes for 69 yards averaging 6.9 YAC for 1 touchdown.  He later played for the Denver Broncos and Carolina Panthers.

References 

1980 births
Living people
People from Franklin, Tennessee
American football fullbacks
Tennessee Volunteers football players
Tennessee Titans players
Denver Broncos players
Carolina Panthers players